The Catholic Church in North Macedonia is part of the worldwide Catholic Church, under the spiritual leadership of the Pope in Rome and is one of the major religious communities that exist on the territory of the Republic of North Macedonia. Catholic believers from North Macedonia mostly include Albanians, Macedonians and Croats and are most concentrated in the Skopje Statistical Region and the Southeastern Statistical Region of North Macedonia. There are around 20,000 Catholics in the country — around 1% of the total population.

The beginning of Christianity in North Macedonia

In the 6th century, Emperor Justinian I (born in Tauresium, today's Gradište in North Macedonia) advanced the status of Christianity across the Eastern Roman (Byzantine) Empire, and is venerated in both the Eastern Orthodox Church and the Roman Catholic Church. After Justinian I, the next cycle in which Christianity began to spread began in the 9th century, when Clement of Ohrid and Saint Naum instituted the Ohrid Literary School during  the Christianization of Bulgaria. At the time, there was a creation of parishes in alignment with the Archbishopric of Ohrid whose autocephaly was maintained until 1767, when the Turks, influenced by the Ecumenical Patriarchate of Constantinople, suspend it.

Skopje Catholic bishops

Diocese of Skopje, under whose jurisdiction are believers of the Western or Roman rite is one of the oldest dioceses in the Balkans and its territory historically is not enough investigated. Many important historical facts and unsolved today. To a better overview, church history in these areas could be divided into three main periods.

First period

See also Diocese of Skopje

The first period of the Christianity in North Macedonia begins with the appearance of Christianity in Europe. Paul the Apostle was missionary at this time. Christianity was present in these areas illustrated by the fact that the Council of Nicea (325), signed between the Assembly's fathers, and the Bishop of Dacosta Scupi (Skopje) was mentioned as bishop in charge of Dardania (Europe) province, whose capital is Skopje, and extends from Niš until Veles (city). The existence of the Diocese does not refer to a clearly defined religious organization in the province headed by Bishop and several bishops. This period is called the "golden period" for the province. Later writers' mention showed five dioceses within the province of Dardania. Pope Gelasius I sent a letter to the six Dardanian bishops of the time.

Second period

The second period is characterized by turbulent conditions and switch to the ends of these arms in the hands of various new rulers. With the arrival of the Turks a hard time for Christians in these areas arose. Five centuries of Ottoman slavery occasionated severe consequences in the diocese. But in a report in Rome dating from 1584, Skopje is mentioned as Catholic Center.

Third period

This period coincides with the founding of the Congregation de Propaganda Fide in 1622. In this period, the Catholic Church devoted more attention to these areas. The apostolic succession of the Catholic Archbishops of Skopje since Andrea Bogdani, an Albanian born in modern day Kosova (1651-1656) until today is continuous. Generally all residential Catholic bishops of Skopje are residential, although many times were forced, because of the Turkish mischief, to change their place of residence, concealing in inaccessible places. Until 1914 Skopje bishops are titled "archbishops". But in a Concordat between Holy See and the Kingdom of Serbs the title of Archbishop was transferred to the bishop of the Archdiocese of Shkodër-Pult. Its last Archbishop was Lazër Mjeda (also an Albanian) in 1921 when was appointed Archbishop of the Archdiocese of Shkodër-Pult. In 1924, after the devastation of World War I, the archdiocese was downgraded to a diocese, and became a suffragan to the Archdiocese of Vrhbosna. In 2000 Pope John Paul II divided Skopje from Apostolic Administration of Prizren and today its jurisdiction extends throughout the territory of North Macedonia.

Macedonian Apostolic Vicariate

In North Macedonia there are Catholics of Byzantine-Catholic rite that fall under the jurisdiction of the Macedonian Apostolic Vicariate.

Macedonian Apostolic Vicariate of the Bulgarians

The movement for liberation and independence gets his swing in mid-19th century, when the whole of Europe is waking to a national consciousness. This movement takes North Macedonia. In the struggle for religious freedom from the Hellenic influence a national spirit in the Macedonian people are waking up and the spirit of ecclesiastical independence from Constantinople Patriarchate arose. Then, a failed request allegiance in various independent churches, trying to free from the jurisdiction of the Patriarch of Constantinople ends in a compound of the local Bulgarians with the Catholic Church in 1859. The center of this movement was the town of Kilkis, what is known as "Union of Kukush". In 1861, Bulgarian Catholic Apostolic Vicariate of Constantinople was created for the Eastern-Catholic Bulgarians of the Byzantine Rite in European provinces of the Ottoman Empire, including the then region of Macedonia. In 1883 as its off-shoot was created a Macedonian Apostolic Vicariate of the Bulgarians based in Thessaloniki. Its first appointed Apostolic Vicar was Lazar Mladenov.

Pastoral Vicariate

With the creation of the Apostolic Vicariate of the Bulgarians in North Macedonia, a legal structure of the Catholic Church of the Byzantine rite in North Macedonia was established. Bishop Mladenov indicates a clear direction for the development of the Catholic Church of Eastern Rite. But unfortunate circumstances affected this region: the Ilinden Uprising, the Balkan Wars and World War I reflects negatively to Catholics. After the First World War the Eastern rite Catholics were found in Vardar Macedonia and Strumica region, and the Pope place them under the care of the then Catholic Archbishop of Skopje. On October 19, 1923 with the provision of the Vatican they became an integral part of Eparchy of Križevci and remain as such until 2001.

Apostolic Exarchate

Pope John Paul II on January 11, 2001 in Vatican signed a decree to establish an Apostolic Exarch for Catholics of the Eastern rite in North Macedonia. The first Apostolic Exarch appointed was Monsignor Joakim Herbut, bishop of the Diocese of Skopje. The seat of the exarchate is the city of Strumica, and the Assumption Church in this city holds the title of Cathedral.

Eparchy

Pope Francis on May 31, 2018 elevated the Apostolic Exarchate to the rank of an Eparchy as the Macedonian Catholic Eparchy of the Assumption of the Blessed Virgin Mary in Strumica-Skopje.

Both Catholic institutions in North Macedonia are under the leadership of one person, Kiro Stojanov, perhaps the only case in the world.

Religious buildings

Roman Catholic Diocese of Skopje

 Cathedral of the Sacred Heart of Jesus (Skopje)
 Holy Heart of Jesus Church in Bitola
 Saint Cyril and Methodius and Saint Benedict Church in Ohrid 
 Catholic Church in Štip

Eparchy of the Macedonian Greek Catholic Church

 Cathedral of Assumption of Blessed Virgin Mary (Strumica)
 Saint Cyril and Methodius Church in Bogdantsi
 Saint Peter and Paul Church in Gevgelija
 Assumption Church in Nova Maala
 Saint Great Martyr George Church - Chanaklija, in Nova Maala
 Saint The prophet Elijah Church in Radovo
 Saint Cyril and Methodius Church (Petralinci)
 Saint Nicholas Church (Sekirnik)
 Saint Apostle Paul Church in Paljurci
 Saint Joseph Church in Bistrentsi

References

Sources

External links
The Holy See — The Vatican's official website

 
North Macedonia
North Macedonia